The 2021 USC Upstate Spartans baseball team represented the University of South Carolina Upstate during the 2021 NCAA Division I baseball season. The Spartans played their home games at Cleveland S. Harley Baseball Park as a member of the Big South Conference. They were led by head coach Mike McGuire, in his second season at Upstate.

USC Upstate finished the season with a 37–16 with a 28–12 Big South record. They were eliminated in the losers bracket first round of the Big South Tournament.

Previous season

The 2020 USC Upstate Spartans baseball team notched a 13–5 (0–0) regular season record. The season prematurely ended on March 12, 2020 due to concerns over the COVID-19 pandemic.

Game log

Rankings

References

External links 
 USC Upstate Spartans 2021 baseball schedule

USC Upstate Spartans
USC Upstate Spartans baseball seasons
USC Upstate Spartans baseball